This is a list of the 22 members of the European Parliament for the Greece in the 2009 to 2014 session.

List

Notes

External links
 European parliament website

Greece
List
2009